Aspiration or aspirations may refer to:

Linguistics 
 Aspirated consonant, a plosive or fricative pronounced with a strong burst of air
 Voiceless glottal fricative, the sound 
 Rough breathing, a symbol used in Ancient Greek to indicate an  sound

Medicine 
 Aspiration, suction (medicine) to remove liquid or gas/dust
 Aspiration, the inhalation of fluid while drinking, a common symptom of dysphagia.
 Aspiration, the practice of pulling back on the plunger of a syringe prior to injecting medication.
 Aspiration pneumonia, a lung infection caused by pulmonary aspiration
 Aspiration thrombectomy, embolectomy where a thrombus is removed by suction
 Bone marrow aspiration
 Joint aspiration, or arthrocentesis
 Nasogastric aspiration or nasogastric intubation, the removal of the stomach's contents via a nasogastric tube
 Needle aspiration biopsy, a surgical procedure
 Pulmonary aspiration, the entry of secretions or foreign material into the trachea and lungs
 Vacuum aspiration, a pregnancy termination procedure

Other uses 
 Aspiration, removal of a liquid or gas by means of suction
 Aspiration, Inc., a personal finance company
 Aspiration management, an individual's need to meet realistic goals, receive feedback and experience a sense of accomplishment
 "Aspirations", a song by Gentle Giant on their album The Power and the Glory
 Naturally aspirated engine, an internal combustion engine that relies on atmospheric pressure for air intake without a supercharger or turbocharger
 Aspiration (album)

See also 

 Aspirating smoke detector, a detector which draws air through pipes
 Aspirator (disambiguation)
 Aspire (disambiguation)